Selimiye is a village in Marmaris District, Muğla Province, Turkey. It belongs to the municipality of Bozburun, in the Bozburun peninsula.

Towns in Turkey